"To the Morning" is the debut single by American folk/soft rock singer-songwriter Dan Fogelberg. It was written by Fogelberg with strings arranged by Glenn Spreen. It is the first song on Side 1 of his debut album, Home Free. The song is about waking up every day and knowing that it's going to be a new day, regardless of anything else, no matter what happens in life. ("It's going to be a day/There's really no way to say no to the morning".) Musically, it is built around piano, with emphasis placed on Fogelberg's vocals while he is singing and the piano or strings during instrumental sections. The song is peculiar in his canon for featuring no guitar.

Though the track length is listed as 6:34 on the CD issue of the album, the length is actually 6:11.

The song was covered by Lani Hall on her 1979 album Double or Nothing.

References

1972 debut singles
Dan Fogelberg songs
Songs written by Dan Fogelberg
1972 songs